Keith Stattenfield is a senior Apple Computer software engineer.  He started at Apple Computer in 1989 in the Information Systems & Technology group, then worked on the Macintosh operating system starting in 1995, from the Mac OS 7.5 release on. He led the Netbooting project starting in Mac OS 8.6, and then served as the overall technical lead of Mac OS 9. His California license plate reads "MAC OS 9".

In 2001, he was ranked 14 on the MDJ POWER 25, a list of the most influential people in the Macintosh community.

He has often presented at conferences such as Apple's Worldwide Developers Conference and MacHack (convention).

Keith has a Public-access television show and web site called Keith Explains.  He is also a frequent guest on the show John Wants Answers.

References

Knaster and Rizzo (2004) "Mac Toys: 12 Cool Projects for Home, Office, and Entertainment"

External links
 Keith Explains
 Keith's personal web page
 Keith's net boot patent mentioned on slashdot
 Keith's net boot patent

Apple Inc. employees
Living people
Year of birth missing (living people)
American inventors